Roxas may refer to:

Places in the Philippines

Cities and municipalities 
 Roxas City
 Roxas, Isabela
 Roxas, Oriental Mindoro
 Roxas, Palawan

Roads 
 Roxas Boulevard
 Paseo de Roxas

Others 
 Roxas Airport

People with the surname Roxas
 Gerardo Roxas y Arroyo (fl. 1839–1891), also known as Gerardo Roxas I, Filipino servant during the Spanish Colonial Era
 Manuel Roxas (1892–1948), former President of the Philippines and son of Gerardo Roxas y Arroyo
 Trinidad Roxas (1900–1995), former First Lady of the Philippines and wife of Manuel Roxas
 Gerardo Roxas (1924–1982), also known as Gerry Roxas, Filipino politician and son of Manuel Roxas
 Mar Roxas (born 1957), Filipino politician and son of Gerardo Roxas
 Gerardo Roxas, Jr. (1960–1993), popularly known as Dinggoy Roxas, Filipino politician and son of Gerardo Roxas
 Juno Roxas (born 1967), Australian musician and actor
 Rogelio Roxas (fl. 1971–1993), Filipino treasure hunter
 Jake Roxas (born 1977), Filipino actor
 Van Roxas (born 1989), Filipino actor and television personality

Fictional characters
 Roxas (Kingdom Hearts), a character from the Kingdom Hearts video game series

See also 

 Rojas, reformed spelling
 President Roxas (disambiguation)
 
 
 Roxa (Canhabaque), Guinea-Bissau; an island
 Roxà (Rosà), Vincenza, Veneto, Italy; a town